Poland competed at the 1928 Summer Olympics in Amsterdam, Netherlands. 93 competitors, 82 men and 11 women, took part in 44 events in 11 sports.

Medalists

Athletics

Men
Track & road events

Field events

Combined events – Decathlon

Women
Track & road events

Field events

Boxing

Men

Cycling

Eleven cyclists, all men, represented Poland in 1928.

Road

Track
Sprint

Time trial

Team Pursuit

Tandem

Equestrian

Five riders, represented Poland in 1928, all they won medals.

Eventing

Show jumping

Fencing

Six fencers, all men, represented Poland in 1928.

 Men

Ranks given are within the pool.

Modern pentathlon

Three male pentathletes represented Poland in 1928.

Rowing

Men

Sailing

Men

Swimming

Men

Women

Wrestling

Men's Greco-Roman

Art competitions

References

External links
Official Olympic Reports
International Olympic Committee results database

Nations at the 1928 Summer Olympics
1928
1928 in Polish sport